Hawk Ridge Park is a public, urban park in Raymore, Missouri. Located at 701 Johnston Parkway in Raymore, Hawk Ridge Park is largely undeveloped. The park contains a stocked lake, rolling hills, and a limited walking trail.

References

Urban public parks
Parks in Cass County, Missouri
Tourist attractions in Raymore, Missouri